Coal & Allied is an Australia coal mining company. Operating mines in the Hunter Region, it is a subsidiary of Yancoal.

History
Coal & Allied was formed in 1960 when Caledonian Collieries and J & A Brown & Abermain-Seaham Collieries merged. Howard Smith owned 50%.

In December 2011, Rio Tinto Coal Australia took full ownership with Coal & Allied delisted from the Australian Securities Exchange. In September 2017, Coal & Allied was sold by Rio Tinto to Yancoal.

Assets

Current
Hunter Valley Operations mine: 67.6%
Mount Thorley mine: 80%
Port Waratah Coal Services: 36.5%
Warkworth mine: 55.6%

Former
Maules Creek coal mine, sold to Whitehaven Coal February 2010

References

Coal companies of Australia
Companies formerly listed on the Australian Securities Exchange
Non-renewable resource companies established in 1960
Rio Tinto (corporation) subsidiaries
1960 establishments in Australia